Fly is an album by the band Fly, drummer Jeff Ballard, bassist Larry Grenadier and saxophonist Mark Turner which was recorded in 2003 and released by the Savoy Jazz label the following year.

Reception

The AllMusic review by Jonathan Widran states "If your ears are starved for innovative jazz that blends punchy sax lines and dense, wild, worldbeat-flavored bass and drum rhythms, let this newly formed trio with an amazing pedigree fill the bill ...  Fly is definitely a cooperative by three major jazz talents".

In JazzTimes, Aaron Steinberg observed that "The spare, layered and frequently funky postbop debut finds the band constantly shifting support and frontline roles as well as melodic and harmonic duties between each member".

Track listing
All compositions by Jeff Ballard except where noted
 "Child's Play" – 7:12
 "Fly Mr. Freakjar" (Ballard, Larry Grenadier, Mark Turner) – 8:29
 "Stark" (Mark Turner) – 6:50
 "JJ" (Grenadier) – 7:21
 "State of the Union" (Grenadier) – 7:30
 "Emergence / Resurgence" (Grenadier) – 4:38
 "Todas Las Cosas Se Van" (Reid Anderson) – 8:18
 "Piano Tune" – 2:55
 "Spanish Castle Magic" (Jimi Hendrix) – 5:43
 "Lone" – 4:33

Personnel
 Mark Turner – bass clarinet, soprano saxophone, tenor saxophone
 Larry Grenadier – bass
 Jeff Ballard – drums

References

2001 albums
Savoy Records albums
Fly (band) albums